CSP-2503 is a potent and selective 5-HT1A receptor agonist, 5-HT2A receptor antagonist, and 5-HT3 receptor antagonist of the phenylpiperazine class. First synthesized in 2003, it was designed based on computational models and QSAR studies. In rat studies, CSP-2503 has demonstrated anxiolytic effects, and thus has been suggested as a treatment for anxiety in humans with a multimodal mechanism of action.

See also 
 Naphthylpiperazine
 S-14,671
 S-14,506

References 

Diketopiperazines
Pyrrolopyrazines
Lactams
Experimental drugs
Naphthylpiperazines